WQNT is an American AM radio station licensed by the Federal Communications Commission (FCC) to Kirkman Broadcasting, Inc. to broadcast on 1450 kHz serving the community of Charleston, South Carolina.  The station's programming format is classic hits. The station's studios are located in the West Ashley portion of Charleston and the transmitter site is in Charleston.

History
The station was originally known as WUSN, signing on in 1948. In 1955, its call sign was changed to WQSN. It started as a Mutual Broadcasting System affiliate. For years WQNT aired CNN Headline News.  As of 2009, it carried Fox Sports Radio, Clemson Tiger Insider Dan Scott, Primetime with the Packman, Jim Rome and the Citadel Sports Network.

In 2011, WQNT aired Steve Czaban and Dan Patrick, with ESPN Radio in the afternoon.

On December 6, 2016, WQNT changed their format from sports to classic hits, branded as "92.1/102.1 The City" (simulcast on FM translators W221CI 92.1 FM Summerville and 102.1 W254BK Charleston).

On August 17, 2020 the 92.1 translator split from its simulcast with WQNT and is temporarily simulcasting WJNI 106.3 FM Ladson.

References

External links
 Official Website

FCC History Cards for WQNT

Classic hits radio stations in the United States
QNT
Radio stations established in 1948